Vasudevanpillai Arundhathiamma Jagadeesh (born 25 May 1983) is a former Indian cricketer who represented Kerala in domestic cricket. In August 2013, he was named to the India A squad to play two unofficial tests against New Zealand A team.

He made his domestic cricket debut in 2004.

References

External links

Indian cricketers
1983 births
Living people
Kerala cricketers
People from Kollam district
Cricketers from Kerala